Inverchaolain Church is a former Church of Scotland church building in Inverchaolain, Argyll and Bute, Scotland. Located on the eastern shores of Loch Striven, just north of Inverchaolain Burn, the church was built in 1912. It is the fourth church on the site, the previous one dating to 1812.

When the foundations of the previous church were dug in 1812, several dozen human skulls were uncovered, as well as a few bones of very large size. Argyll and Bute Council have listed a claymore stone, an ancient tombstone with a Gaelic inscription and a coping stone from the pre-Reformation church, as being in an around the property.

The church closed in 1990.

Graveyard
The graveyard contains burials and headstones from previous incarnations of the church. There were around 230 gravestones as of 2014, the earliest dating to 1732.

References

Bibliography
County Council of Argyll. (1914) List of ancient monuments and historic buildings in the county of Argyll. [s.l.]. Page(s): 20 RCAHMS Shelf Number: D.11.11.COU
NSA. (1834-1845) The new statistical account of Scotland by the ministers of the respective parishes under the superintendence of a committee of the society for the benefit of the sons and daughters of the clergy, 15v. Edinburgh. Page(s): Vol. 7, (Argyll) 112, 113 RCAHMS Shelf Number: B.2.2.STA
RCAHMS. (1992a) The Royal Commission on the Ancient and Historical Monuments of Scotland. Argyll: An inventory of the monuments: Volume 7: Mid-Argyll and Cowal: Medieval and later monuments. {Edinburgh}. Page(s): 80-1, No. 40 RCAHMS Shelf Number: A.1.1.INV/25

External links
 Inverchaolain Church (Former) – ScottishChurches.org.uk
A photo of the third church – clanlamontsociety.co.uk
Panoroma of the church and graveyard – Google Maps, October 2015

Churches in Argyll and Bute
Inverchaolain
1912 establishments in Scotland
1990 disestablishments in Scotland